Chris Woerts (born 2 January 1959, Maassluis) is a Dutch business man and currently director of CWO Consultancy & Marketing.

Woerts started his career as a journalist of the newspaper Rotterdams Nieuwsblad. After his spell as a journalist he became International Sponsorship Manager at Heineken International in 1988. Here he brought Amstel together with the UEFA Champions League. He also introduced the Heineken inflatable cups. Other main sponsor activities he was involved in were the sponsor activities around the  Amstel Gold Race, the Heineken Dutch Open Golf, the Night of the proms, the Buckler Cycling Team and the Holland Heineken House, where Dutch sports fans can celebrate medals during the Olympics.

In 1996, he became the Director of Football for Coca-Cola where he was responsible for their sponsorship strategy during UEFA Euro 1996 as well as the 1998 FIFA World Cup. He also was responsible for the contract negotiations of the 2002 and 2006 FIFA World Cup, UEFA Euro 2000 and also with the CONCACAF, CONMEBOL and the Asian Football Confederation. He was also involved in the implementation for all marketing activities which were organised in more than 200 countries worldwide.

Woerts joined Feyenoord Rotterdam as a marketing manager and was involved with several successful projects such as Feyenoord TV, the Feyenoord newspaper as well as the Children's club named Kameraadjes. He also set up several merchandising activities in foreign countries like the Ono Adventure in Japan and the Ghaly Adventure in Egypt. In 2002, he was named "Mega Marketeer of the year" by marketing institute NIMA.

From 2004 to 2005 he was commercial director for the Eredivisie. Here he was responsible for the successful TV Tender, and also for the appointment of six new commercial partners for the competition. Besides that he had a great influence on the current Eredivisie logo and the current tune by DJ Tiësto. In 2005, he was named as the "Most successful person in the sponsor market". Since the summer of 2005 he is back at Feyenoord where he again became marketing manager and where he also is commercial director. In 2008, he left Feyenoord to become International Business Development Director and member of the Board at Sunderland AFC in England.

References
 sportaccord.com
 marketing-congres.nl
 sportsspeakers.nl 

1959 births
Living people
People from Maassluis
Dutch businesspeople
Feyenoord non-playing staff